Bunker Hill Elementary School can refer to several schools in the United States, including:
 Bunker Hill Elementary School in Indianapolis, Indiana
 Bunker Hill Elementary School in unincorporated Coos County, Oregon
 Bunker Hill Elementary School in Bunker Hill Village, Texas
 Bunker Hill Elementary School in Washington, D.C.; listed on the National Register of Historic Places
 Bunker Hill Elementary School in unincorporated Berkeley County, West Virginia